Pavle Milosavljević (born 21 June 1987) is a Serbian former professional footballer who currently is the assistant manager of FF Jaro.

References

External links
 

1987 births
Living people
Serbian footballers
Association football defenders
FK Srem players
Seinäjoen Jalkapallokerho players
Ilves players
FF Jaro players
Jakobstads BK players
Serbian First League players
Veikkausliiga players
Ykkönen players
Kakkonen players
Serbian expatriate footballers
Serbian expatriate sportspeople in Finland
Expatriate footballers in Finland
People from Sremska Mitrovica